The 1920 Colorado Agricultural Aggies football team represented Colorado Agricultural College (now known as Colorado State University) in the Rocky Mountain Conference (RMC) during the 1920 college football season.  In their tenth season under head coach Harry W. Hughes, the Aggies compiled a 6–1–1 record (6–0–1 against RMC opponents), won the RMC championship, and outscored all opponents by a total of 152 to 14.

Five Colorado Agricultural players received all-conference honors in 1920: fullback Harry Scott, tackle H.L. (Hap) Dotson, halfback Duane Hartshorn, end Charles Bresnahan, and guard Roy Ratekin.

Schedule

References

Colorado Agricultural
Colorado State Rams football seasons
Rocky Mountain Athletic Conference football champion seasons
Colorado Agricultural Aggies football